Jock Dalrymple (3 February 1892 – 14 May 1960) was a British athlete. He competed in the men's javelin throw at the 1924 Summer Olympics.

References

External links
 

1892 births
1960 deaths
Athletes (track and field) at the 1924 Summer Olympics
British male javelin throwers
Olympic athletes of Great Britain
Place of birth missing